Emanuel Lutheran Church is a historic Lutheran church at 4311 San Jacinto Ave. in Dallas, Texas.

It was built in 1931 and added to the National Register of Historic Places in 1995. The congregation is currently affiliated with the Evangelical Lutheran Church in America.

The building is also home to the Emanuel Community Center.

See also

National Register of Historic Places listings in Dallas County, Texas

References

Churches in Dallas
Dallas Emmanuel
Dallas EmmanuelLutheran
National Register of Historic Places in Dallas
Dallas EmmanuelLutheran
Dallas EmmanuelLutheran
Dallas Emmanuel
1931 establishments in Texas